The 2015 USA Sevens (also sometimes referred to as the 2015 Las Vegas Sevens) is the twelfth edition of the USA Sevens tournament, and the fifth tournament of the 2014–15 Sevens World Series. The tournament is scheduled for February 13–15, 2015 at Sam Boyd Stadium in Las Vegas, Nevada.

Format
The teams were drawn into four pools of four teams each. Each team played everyone in their pool one time. The top two teams from each pool advanced to the Cup/Plate brackets. The bottom two teams from each group went to the Bowl/Shield brackets.

Teams
The following teams will participate in the tournament.

Match officials
The match officials for the 2015 Wellington Sevens are as follows:

  Mike Adamson (Scotland)
  Federico Anselmi (Argentina)
  Nick Briant (New Zealand)
  Ben Crouse (South Africa)
  Richard Kelly (New Zealand)
  Anthony Moyes (Australia)
  Matt O'Brien (Australia)
 
  Marius van der Westhuizen (South Africa)

Pool stage

Pool A

Pool B

Pool C

Pool D

Knockout stage

Shield

Bowl

Plate

Cup

References

External links
 USA Sevens official website

2015
Sports competitions in Las Vegas
USA Sevens
USA Sevens
USA Sevens
2015 rugby sevens competitions